Trueba is a Spanish surname of Basque origins. It derives from the Trueba river. Notable people with the surname include:

Antonio de Trueba (1819–1889), Spanish poet, novelist, and folklorist 
Andrés Martínez Trueba (1884–1959), Uruguayan politician
Vicente Trueba (1905–1986), Spanish cyclist
Fernando Trueba (born 1955), Spanish screenwriter, film director and producer
David Trueba (born 1969), Spanish writer, film director and screenwriter
Jonás Trueba, born 1981) Spanish film maker

References

Spanish-language surnames
Basque-language surnames
Spanish toponymic surnames